Sydney Tamiia Poitier (born 1973/1974) is an American-Canadian television and film actress.

Early life and family
Born in Los Angeles on November 15, 1973, Poitier is the daughter of the late Bahamian-American actor Sidney Poitier and Canadian actress Joanna Shimkus. Her mother is of Lithuanian Jewish and Irish Catholic descent. She has an older sister, Anika. She also has four older half-sisters, Beverly, Pamela, Sherri, and Gina, from her father's first marriage.

Poitier attended NYU's Tisch School of the Arts where she earned a bachelor's degree in acting. She also studied at Stella Adler Studio of Acting.

Poitier and her husband, musician Dorian Heartsong, have 1 child together, a daughter born in 2015.

Career
Poitier began her career of acting in the late 1990s. In 2001, she landed her first role on television in the NBC drama series First Years. The series was canceled after three episodes. In 2003, she starred in the UPN sitcom Abby. That series was also canceled during its first season. Later that same year, she had a recurring role in Joan of Arcadia, where she played Rebecca Askew, the love interest of Joan's older brother, Kevin (Jason Ritter). She was also a regular on the first season of Veronica Mars. However, she left the show after only appearing in four episodes because of budget cuts.

In 2007, Poitier starred in Death Proof, director Quentin Tarantino's segment of the movie Grindhouse, as radio DJ Jungle Julia. The next year, she had a co-starring role in the new Knight Rider series, as FBI Agent Carrie Rivai.  In 2011, she guest-starred on two episodes of Private Practice.

Poitier starred as Detective Sam Shaw in the Canadian crime comedy series Carter, which ran for two seasons in 2018 and 2019.

Filmography

Film

Television

References

External links

 

20th-century American actresses
21st-century American actresses
Actresses from Los Angeles
African-American Jews
American film actresses
American people of Bahamian descent
American people of Canadian descent
American people of Haitian descent
American people of Irish descent
American people of Lithuanian-Jewish descent
American television actresses
Living people
Stella Adler Studio of Acting alumni
Tisch School of the Arts alumni
Year of birth missing (living people)